Yuriy Yanko (Yuriy Volodymyrovych Yanko) is a Ukrainian conductor.

Born in Kharkiv, Yanko completed the first part of his musical studies in his native town at Special Music School (1980). He then attended Kharkiv University of Arts (1985) and Kyiv National Conservatory (1991), studying operatic & symphonic conducting with Turchak, Dushchenko, Vakhtang Jordania.

Yanko has been Conductor of the Academic Philharmonic Orchestra in Zaporizhzhya (1991–1994), and Music Director and Conductor of the Kharkiv Special Music School Chamber Orchestra (1999–2004). Since 1994, he has conducted at the Kharkiv Opera House, where he has staged many opera and ballet performances.

Since 2001 Yanko has worked as Music Director and Principal Conductor of the Academic Symphony Orchestra of Kharkiv Philharmonic, and in 2004 he was appointed Director of the Kharkiv Philharmonic (which involves several different musical collectives, including the orchestra).

Yanko has received Kharkiv Regional Government Diplomas (2002, 2006), and Kharkiv Mayor’s supreme award “For Zeal” (2004). He has been annual laureate of regional rate ”Kharkiver of year” for 6 years (2001–2006), and prize-winner of the “Public Recognition” prize (2004), laureate of regional rate ”Kharkiver of the 21st century”, 2010.

He has conducted in  many countries: Austria, Holland, Egypt, Spain, Italy, Germany, South Korea, Czech, Poland, Bulgaria, Russia, USA, France, and Switzerland.

In the past few years he has guest conducted at the Musikverein Vienna, Rome Symphonic Oorchestra, Berlin Symphonic Orchestra, Budapest Symphonic Orchestra, Orquesta Sinfónica Nacional de México, Praha Radio Symphony Orchestra, Kammerphilarmonie Muenchen, Kaertner Symfony Klagenfurt, North Czech Philharmonic Orchestra, and Nuenberger Symphoniker.

RECORDINGS: Shostakovich concerts № 6, № 2  are recorded Moravian Philharmonic in the Czech Radio studios in Olomouc.

Singers:
Sergey Stilmashenko (Grand Opera)       
 
Instrumentalists - Anton Sorokov (piano), Vadim Repin(violin), Daniil Kramer (piano), Alexander Knyazev (cello), Dmitry Bashkirov (piano), Nikolay Petrov (piano), Vladimir Kraynev (piano), Victor Pikayzen (violin), and Sergey Stadler (violin).

He has received the order of merits for the republic of Ukraine from the president of Ukraine.

See also 
 Kharkiv Philharmonic Society

Links 
 Information about Yuriy Yanko in the official site of Kharkiv Philharmonic Society. 
 Янко Юрий Владимирович. 
 У етері інформаційної-аналітичної програми «Насправді». 
 Директора харківської філармонії побили на порозі будинку. 
 Юрій Янко займеться культурою курсантів ХНУВС. 
 Юрій Янко: «Культура — це не прийти концерт прослухати, це повага до іншої людини». 
 Юрій Янко за сайті ХОФ. 

Ukrainian conductors (music)
Male conductors (music)
Living people
Year of birth missing (living people)
21st-century conductors (music)
21st-century male musicians